Mindscape is a 1976 pinscreen animation short film by Jacques Drouin, produced by the National Film Board of Canada. 

It was Drouin's second pinscreen work, after his 1974 work Trois exercices sur l'écran d'épingles d'Alexeieff, and received tremendous international recognition.

A film without dialogue, Mindscape shows an artist stepping inside his painting and wandering through a symbolically rich landscape. The film had a budget of $38,740.

Awards
 Ottawa International Animation Festival, Ottawa: Special Jury Award, 1976
 CINANIMA International Animated Film Festival, Espinho, Portugal -  Silver Dolphin for the Best Film 3-11 minutes (tie), 1977
 Chicago International Film Festival, Chicago: Bronze Hugo, 1977 
 Columbus International Film & Animation Festival, Columbus, Ohio: Chris Bronze Plaque, 1977
 Linz International Short Film Festival, Linz: Special Award for Best Musical Adaptation for a Film, 1977
 Yorkton Film Festival, Yorkton: Golden Sheaf Award for Best Animated Film, 1977
 Golden Gate International Film Festival, San Francisco: Diploma for Outstanding Achievement, 1977
 International Short Film Festival Oberhausen, Oberhausen: Diploma of Honour by the International Jury, 1977
 HEMISFILM, San Antonio, TX: Bronze Medal, 1977
 Virgin Islands International Animated Film Festival, St. Thomas: Silver Venus for Best Short Film, 1977
 Long Island Film Festival, Long Island: Golden Image Award, First Prize, 1977
 American Film and Video Festival, New York: Red Ribbon, Visual Essays, 1978
 Baltimore Film Festival, Baltimore: First Prize, Best Film of the Festival, 1978
 Baltimore Film Festival, Baltimore: First Prize, Animation, 1978
 Southwest Film Festival, Tulsa: First Prize, Professional, 1978
 Kenyon Film Festival, Gambier, Ohio: First Jury Prize, 1978
 Athens Short Film Festival, Athens, Georgia: Award of Merit, 1978

References

Works cited

External links
Watch Mindscape at NFB.ca

1976 films
Pinscreen animation
National Film Board of Canada animated short films
Quebec films
Animated films without speech
1970s animated short films
1976 animated films
1970s Canadian films